IAQ, a three letter acronym, may refer to:

 Indoor air quality
 Infrequently Asked Questions, FAQs for fictional video games